= Barry Cordjohn =

English footballer (born 1942)

Personal information
- Date of birth: 5 September 1942 (age 84)
- Place of birth: Oxford, England
- Position: Right back

Senior career*
Years	Team	Apps	(Gls)
1962–1963	Charlton Athletic	0	(0)
1963–1964	Aldershot	0	(0)
1964–1965	Portsmouth	14	(0)
1965–1967	Wimbledon	58	(5)
1968–1969	Margate	0	(0)
- * Club domestic league appearances and goals

Barry Cordjohn (born 5 September 1942) is an English former professional footballer who played in the Football League as a defender.

== Career ==
Coedjohn came through the youth ranks at Charlton Athletic before graduating to the first team. After a short spell with Aldershot, he represented Portsmouth and Wimbledon, where he made 91 senior appearances over three seasons, before joining Margate. At Margate, he made a single senior appearance in the Kent Floodlit Cup. His career ended after he sustained an injury during a reserve game and was later diagnosed with tetanus.
